Statistics of Empress's Cup in the 2007 season.

Overview
It was contested by 32 teams, and Nippon TV Beleza won the championship.

Results

1st round
Briosita Akita 2006 0-1 Kibi International University
Kochi Ganador FC 0-7 Nippon Sport Science University
Iga FC Fraulein 0-8 JEF United Chiba
Nippon TV Menina 8-0 Fukui University of Technology Fukui High School
Shimizudaihachi Pleiades 4-0 Hiroshima Bunkyo Women's University High School
Fujieda Junshin High School 0-1 Hoo High School
Osaka University of Health and Sport Sciences 0-1 TEPCO Mareeze
Renaissance Kumamoto FC 0-1 Hinomoto Gakuen High School

2nd round
Fukuoka J. Anclas 0-0 (pen 0-3) Kibi International University
Nippon Sport Science University 1-1 (pen 3-5) Speranza FC Takatsuki
Bunnys Kyoto SC 1-2 JEF United Chiba
Nippon TV Menina 11-0 Kagoshima Kamoike FC Asahina
Tokiwagi Gakuken High School 3-2 Shimizudaihachi Pleiades
Hoo High School 0-1 AS Elfen Sayama FC
Hokkaido Bunkyo University Meisei High School 0-2 TEPCO Mareeze
Hinomoto Gakuen High School 2-3 Urawa Reds Junior Youth

3rd round
Tasaki Perule FC 1-0 Kibi International University
Speranza FC Takatsuki 2-1 Iga FC Kunoichi
INAC Leonessa 4-1 JEF United Chiba
Nippon TV Menina 0-4 Okayama Yunogo Belle
Urawa Reds 3-1 Tokiwagi Gakuken High School
AS Elfen Sayama FC 1-2 Ohara Gakuen JaSRA
Albirex Niigata 1-0 TEPCO Mareeze
Urawa Reds Junior Youth 0-3 Nippon TV Beleza

Quarterfinals
Tasaki Perule FC 2-0 Speranza FC Takatsuki
INAC Leonessa 2-0 Okayama Yunogo Belle
Urawa Reds 4-0 Ohara Gakuen JaSRA
Albirex Niigata 0-9 Nippon TV Beleza

Semifinals
Tasaki Perule FC 2-1 INAC Leonessa
Urawa Reds 0-3 Nippon TV Beleza

Final
Tasaki Perule FC 0-2 Nippon TV Beleza
Nippon TV Beleza won the championship.

References

Empress's Cup
2007 in Japanese women's football